Japanese football in 2012

Domestic leagues

Promotion and relegation
Teams relegated from J.League Division 1
Avispa Fukuoka
Montedio Yamagata
Ventforet Kofu

Teams promoted to J.League Division 1
Sagan Tosu
F.C. Tokyo
Consadole Sapporo

Teams relegated from J.League Division 2
No relegation to the Japan Football League

Teams promoted to J.League Division 2
Matsumoto Yamaga F.C.
F.C. Machida Zelvia

J.League Division 1

Sanfrecce Hiroshima won the J. League title, their first in 42 years and first in the J. League era, marking their sixth time overall atop the Japanese football league system. Vegalta Sendai, which led the table riding on the wave of their fourth-place finish the previous year, ended up in second place after Albirex Niigata defeated them in the round before last. Urawa Red Diamonds was able to pass four other teams, including newly promoted Sagan Tosu, who surprisingly was in third place in the penultimate round.

Consadole Sapporo was relegated on September 30, the earliest a team has been relegated in the modern-day era. Niigata's victory enabled them to climb to safety while Vissel Kobe was relegated after six seasons. Gamba Osaka, despite scoring more goals than anyone else, had a poor defense and allowed many goals in, causing them to be relegated after 26 seasons in the top division.

J.League Division 2

Ventforet Kofu returned to the top flight at the first attempt, but this time they did so as champions. Shonan Bellmare returned to the top division as well, after two seasons. Oita Trinita, despite overwhelming odds due to its position and the playoff rules which favored the three higher-ranked teams, won the playoff and returned to the top flight after three seasons.

Newly promoted Machida Zelvia, despite hiring Osvaldo Ardiles as their manager, could not cope with professionalism and finished in bottom place, being relegated as V-Varen Nagasaki won the JFL championship.

Japan Football League

Although Arte Takasaki withdrew from the league due to economic problems, the JFL decided to go with a 17-team format. V-Varen Nagasaki won the tournament, joining the professional ranks automatically.

Sagawa Shiga withdrew after the league following parent company Sagawa Express's decision to close the team, leaving Tochigi Uva to playout against the Regional League promotion series third place.

Japanese Regional Leagues

Kantō champions SC Sagamihara and Tōhoku champions Fukushima United won first and second place in the Regional League promotion series, thus being promoted automatically, while Hokkaidō champions Norbritz Hokkaido battled in the playout against Tochigi Uva but lost.

Domestic cups

Emperor's Cup

J. League Cup

Japanese Super Cup

International club competitions

Suruga Bank Championship

FIFA Club World Cup

Will take place between 6 and 16 December 2012.
Since the tournament is hosted in Japan the winners of the J. League will be invited to take part. If the AFC Champions League winner is from Japan, then the highest placed non-Japanese team of the AFC Champions League will be invited in place of the J. League winner.

National team (Men)

Results

Players statistics

Goal scorers

National team (Women)

Results

Players statistics

References

External links

 
Seasons in Japanese football